"Torch" is a song by English synthpop duo Soft Cell. It was released as a single in 1982, and in mid-June peaked at number two on the UK Singles Chart, ranking 45 for the year. It also reached number 31 on the Hot Dance Club Play chart, number 12 in the Netherlands and number 6 in the Flemish Ultratop 50

Singer Marc Almond duets towards the end of the song with Cindy Ecstasy, an American clubgoer the band had met at the after-hours bar Club Berlin in New York the year previously.

The single was originally intended to be double A-sided, coupled with the eventual B-side song "Insecure Me"; as such, both songs were included in the band's 2018 singles compilation Keychains & Snowstorms: The Singles.

"Torch" ranked 49 in the New Musical Express critics' list of the year's 50 best singles.

Charts

References

Soft Cell songs
1982 singles
1982 songs
Songs written by Marc Almond
Songs written by David Ball (electronic musician)
Some Bizzare Records singles